Jamkhed Dam is an earthfill dam on local river near Mukhed, Nanded district in state of Maharashtra in India.

Specifications

Purpose
 Irrigation

See also
 Dams in Maharashtra
 List of reservoirs and dams in India

References

Dams in Nanded district
Year of establishment missing